Ian Shaw Billcliff (born 26 October 1972) is a Canadian cricketer. Though born in Canada, he grew up in New Zealand.

Billcliff made his debut in first-class cricket in 1991 for Otago in New Zealand domestic cricket, and in 1992 he played twice for the New Zealand Under-19 team. He later played for Wellington from 1995 to 1997, and then for Auckland from 1997 to 1999. After leaving Auckland, he played club cricket in England in the Surrey League.

Billcliff became interested in playing a season in Canada and got in contact with the Canadian cricket president via an ICC Development Manager. 
Having revealed his place-of-birth, he was immediately chosen for Canada's squad in the 2001 ICC Trophy, and was an important part of the team who achieved a third-place finish, thus progressing to the World Cup. He made important contributions in the World Cup matches, including a 42 in the match against Bangladesh, and a 71 in the match against Kenya.

Since the 2003 World Cup he has played just two One Day Internationals for Canada, against Bermuda in August 2006. He has played in other tournaments for Canada though, including the 2005 ICC Trophy, the ICC Americas Championship in 2004 and 2006, and three ICC Intercontinental Cup matches. He has also captained Canada on occasion.

Billcliff continued to play cricket in New Zealand, but only in club cricket in Auckland where he has played for Cornwall. In the 2006–07 season, he played for the newly formed University/Ellerslie club, a merger between Auckland University Cricket Club and Ellerslie Cricket Club.

References

External links
 

1972 births
Auckland cricketers
Canada One Day International cricketers
Canada Twenty20 International cricketers
Canadian cricketers
Cariboo people
Cricketers at the 2003 Cricket World Cup
People educated at Otago Boys' High School
Living people
Canadian emigrants to New Zealand
Otago cricketers
Cricketers from British Columbia
Wellington cricketers
New Zealand cricketers